Atómico, is a television show produced by Maraba Productions for Venevisión. Hosted by Alfredo Lovera as Himself, Mariana Álvarez as Herself, Joshua García as Himself and Natalia Moretti Herself.

History 
Atómico it began airing as a similar program to El Club de Los Tigritos and Rugemania with Interactive Games, Music, cartoons, Series. in 2006, the program ended to begin issuing Venevisión telenovelas. As of March 3, 2014, as established by the "La ley de resorte de Venezuela", Venevisión telenovela removed 3 hours to transmit Atómico.

Presenters 
Alfredo Lovera as Himself
Mariana Álvarez as Herself
Joshua García as Himself 
Natalia Moretti as Herself
Antonella Baricelli as Herself (2005-2006)
Alex Goncalves as Himself (2005-2006)
Sheryl Rubio as Herself (2005-2006)

Guests 
Víctor Drija
Los Hermanos Valentinos (Appear during the circus performance)

Programs broadcast

Current broadcast 
Chica vampiro
Somos tú y yo
Sam & Cat
The Penguins of Madagascar
SpongeBob SquarePants
ICarly

Programs that are no longer transmitted 
Some of these series are transmitted on Saturday and Sunday Atómico repetitions. Others are issued occasionally.

No puede ser
Bondi Band
Kung Fu Panda: Legends of Awesomeness
Power Rangers Jungle Fury
The Fairly OddParents
Victorious
Marvin Marvin
Big Time Rush
Planet Sheen
El Club de Los Tigritos
Fanboy & Chum Chum

Programming 2001-2004 
Animaniacs
Digimon: Digital Monsters
Fantastic Four
The Flintstones
The Huckleberry Hound Show
Jabberjaw
Looney Tunes
Pinky and the Brain
Power Rangers
The Quick Draw McGraw Show
Sabrina: The Animated Series
Scooby-Doo, Where Are You!
Tiny Toon Adventures
Top Cat
Woody Woodpecker
X-Men

Programming 2005-2008 
The Amanda Show
Bayblade en caricaturas
Camp Lazlo
Danny Phantom
Drake & Josh
Foster's Home for Imaginary Friends
Grossology
Hannah Montana
Jackie Chan Adventures
Kenan & Kel
Lizzie McGuire
Misión S.O.S
My Gym Partner's a Monkey
Phil of the Future
Pokémon
The Powerpuff Girls
Shaggy & Scooby-Doo Get a Clue!
SpongeBob SquarePants
That's So Raven
The Zeta Project
Zoboomafoo
Zoey 101

References

External links 
 Web site

Venevisión original programming